Louis-Joseph-Raphaël Collin (17 June 1850 – 21 October 1916) was a French painter born and raised in Paris, where he became a prominent academic painter and a teacher.  He is principally known for the links he created between French and Japanese art, in both painting and ceramics.

Early life
Collin studied at the school of Saint-Louis, then went to Verdun where he was at school with Jules Bastien-Lepage; they became close friends. Collin then went to Paris and studied in the atelier of Bouguereau and then joined Lepage at Alexandre Cabanel's atelier where they both worked alongside Fernand Cormon, Aimé Morot and Benjamin Constant. Collin painted still-lives, nudes, portraits and genre pieces, and preferred to render his subjects en plein air with a clear and luminous palette.

Career
Around 1873 he began successfully exhibiting at the Salon. He won a number of prizes that helped launch his career, and before long he was receiving increasingly prestigious commissions to paint large scale murals in major public buildings around Paris, including some of the most prominent cultural centers of Paris: the Hôtel de Ville, the Théatre de l'éon, and the Opéra-Comique. He provided designs for decorative plates made by Théodore Deck.

Collin's early work closely followed the essential tenets of French academism. Like the Renaissance painters they admired, the nineteenth-century academicians used historical, religious, or allegorical painting to communicate an idea. Within the parameters of this literary art, Collin made subtle modifications to the accepted academic style, introducing elements of the impressionist technique into his allegorical scenes. Such formal techniques as formal composition and bright color evoked the light filled landscapes of impressionism rather than the dark chiaroscuro of Renaissance painting.

During the last few decades of the nineteenth century, academic painting in France was in crisis, eclipsed by the new artistic movements of impressionism and symbolism. Collin's friendship with members of the impressionists provided him with insights into the new direction contemporary painting was taking. He adapted his work accordingly and in such paintings as Young Woman, he found a compromise between the academic style and the new painterly innovations of the impressionists and the Nabis. Collin began to emphasize the picture surface by reducing the spatial depth of his paintings as well as composing with areas of concentrated color. Yet he never completely abandoned the hallmarks of academicism: allegory and naturalism.

Collin figured prominently in artistic exchanges between Paris and Tokyo during the late nineteenth century as Kuroda Seiki, Kume Keiichirō, and Okada Saburōsuke, among others, studied in his studio and at the Académie Colarossi, where Collin was associated. Kuroda and Kume, who subsequently assumed professorships at the Tokyo Fine Arts School (Tokyo Bijutsu Gakkō), were especially instrumental in introducing to Japan Collin's academic teaching methods as well as the lighter palette, brushwork, and plein air approach he espoused. This mentorship of the first generation of Japanese oil painters contributed to the special respect he continues to enjoy in Japan.

Collin also illustrated many books, notably Daphnis and Chloé (1890) and Chansons de Bilitis (1906).

Honours
 1889 Grand Prix, Exposition Universelle
 1894 Officier of the Légion d'honneur
 Chevalier of the order of St Michael of Bavaria
 Order of the Rising Sun of Japan

Gallery

Principal works
 Idylle, 1875
 Daphnis & Chloé, 1877  (exhibited at the Musée des Beaux-Arts et de la Dentelle, Alençon)
 Portrait of the artist’s father, 1887
 Portrait of M S Hayem, 1879
 Portrait of Mlle C, 1880
 La Musique, 1880
 Petits portraits en plein air, 1881
 Idylle, 1882
 Été, 1884
 Floréal, 1886
 Fin d’été & Jeunesse Sorbonne, 1889
 Plafond pour l’Odéon, 1891
 Au bord de la mer, 1892

References

 Edition: Guth, Christine M.E., Volk, Alicia, Yamanashi, Emiko, Japan & Paris: Impressionism, Postimpressionism, and the Moderne Era, Honolulu Academy of Arts, 15 September 2004; 
 Obituary
 Links with Japanese Art

External links
 
 Jennifer A. Thompson, “Morning by Louis-Joseph-Raphaël Collin (inv. 2956),” in The John G. Johnson Collection: A History and Selected Works, a Philadelphia Museum of Art free digital publication

1850 births
1916 deaths
French muralists
École des Beaux-Arts alumni
French ceramists
19th-century French painters
French male painters
French Symbolist painters
French portrait painters
19th-century French illustrators
20th-century French illustrators
20th-century French painters
20th-century French male artists
Officiers of the Légion d'honneur
Painters from Paris
Recipients of the Order of the Rising Sun
19th-century French male artists